Afshari is a surname. Notable people with the surname include:

Ali Afshari (born 1973), Iranian activist
Reza Afshari, Iranian historian
Rodney Afshari (born 1972), American talent agent

See also
Afshar language, Turkic language
Afshari (music), an avaz of the Dastgah system of Iranian/Persian classical music